Old Mill at Tinton Falls is located in Tinton Falls, Monmouth County, New Jersey, United States. The mill was built in 1676 and was added to the National Register of Historic Places on April 24, 1973.

See also
List of the oldest buildings in New Jersey
National Register of Historic Places listings in Monmouth County, New Jersey

References

Industrial buildings completed in 1676
Buildings and structures in Monmouth County, New Jersey
Tinton Falls, New Jersey
National Register of Historic Places in Monmouth County, New Jersey
Grinding mills in New Jersey
New Jersey Register of Historic Places
1676 establishments in New Jersey
Grinding mills on the National Register of Historic Places in New Jersey

https://thecrawfordhouse.org/wp-content/uploads/2019/05/TFHistory.pdf